Duntze is a surname. Notable people with the surname include:

 Duntze baronets
 Sir John Duntze, 1st Baronet ( 1735–1795), English merchant, banker, and politician